The golden babbler (Cyanoderma chrysaeum) is a babbler species in the family Timaliidae. It occurs from the foothills of the Eastern Himalayas to Southeast Asia and inhabits subtropical lowland and montane forests. It is listed as Least Concern on the IUCN Red List because of its wide distribution.

It has olive-green wings and yellow underparts. Its crown and nape are golden-yellow with narrow stripes.

Stachyris chrysaea was the scientific name proposed by Edward Blyth in 1844 who described an olivaceous babbler with a yellow crown from Nepal.
Since 2016, it is recognised as a Cyanoderma species.

References

External links 

Cyanoderma
Birds of Eastern Himalaya
Birds of Southeast Asia
Birds of Yunnan
golden babbler
golden babbler
Taxonomy articles created by Polbot
Birds of Myanmar